Kim Young-sam (born April 4, 1982) is a retired South Korean football player who played for Ulsan Hyundai FC.

Honours
Ulsan Hyundai
 AFC Champions League (1): 2012

References

1982 births
Living people
South Korean footballers
K League 1 players
Gimcheon Sangmu FC players
Ulsan Hyundai FC players
Korea University alumni

Association football midfielders